Nikita Gudozhnikov (born 21 November 1994) is a former Russian tennis player.

Gudozhnikov made his ATP main draw debut at the 2012 St. Petersburg Open in the doubles draw partnering Ričardas Berankis after the pair received entry into the main draw as wildcards.

Gudozhnikov was banned for 30 months and fined $7,500 in February 2021 for his failure to cooperate with the ITIA.

Gudoznhikov Nikita studied in Lesgaft National State University of Physical Education (2012-2017), Herodotou Tennis Academy (2014-2016), Sydney Olympic Park Tennis Centre (2011). Played for Tennis Club de Beaulieu (2017-2018).

Professional overall Win rate is 37% (includes ITF, ATP and Davis Cup professional level results).

References

External links

1994 births
Living people
Russian male tennis players
Tennis controversies
Sportspeople involved in betting scandals
20th-century Russian people
21st-century Russian people